Beketov is a Russian male surname. Its feminine counterpart is Beketova. Notable people with the surname include:

Aleksandr Beketov (born 1970), Russian épée fencer and Olympic gold medalist
Andrey Beketov (1825–1902), Russian botanist
Artyom Beketov (born 1984), Russian football player
Mikhail Beketov (1958–2013), editor-in-chief of "Khimkinskaya Pravda", defender of the Khimki Forest
Nikolay Beketov (1827–1911), Russian chemist
Beketov (crater), a lunar crater named after Nikolay Beketov
Pyotr Beketov, 17th-century Russian explorer and voevoda of Siberian Cossacks
Sofia Beketova (born 1948), Russian rower

Other uses
Arkhitektora Beketova (Kharkiv Metro), a metro station in Kharkiv, Ukraine

Russian-language surnames